Thank you is a common expression of gratitude.

Thank You or Thank U may also refer to:

Film and television

Films 
 Thank You (1925 film), an American film directed by John Ford
 Thank You (2011 film), a Bollywood romantic comedy
 Thank You (2013 film), a Malayalam drama thriller film
 Thank You (2022 film), an Indian Telugu-language film

Television 
 Thank You (TV series), a 2007 South Korean television series
 "Thank You", an episode of the third season of Adventure Time
 "Thank You" (The Walking Dead), an episode

Music

Albums
 Thank You (Declan Galbraith album), 2006
 Thank You (Diana Ross album) or the title song, 2021
 Thank You (Duran Duran album) or the title song, 1995
 Thank You (Jamelia album) or the title song (see below), 2003
 Thank You (Meghan Trainor album) or the title song, 2016
 Thank You (Royal Trux album), 1995
 Thank You (Stone Temple Pilots album), 2003
 Thank You (Zemfira album) or the title song, 2007
 Thank You (For Letting Us Be Ourselves), by Hardcore Superstar, 2001
 Thank You...Goodnight!, by Great White, 2002
 Thank U (album), by CNBLUE, 2010
 Thank You, by Michael Schenker, 1993
 Thank You, by Monkey Majik, 2006
 Thank You, by Nicoleta Alexandru, 2009
 Thank You, by Puffy AmiYumi, 2011
 Thank You or the title song, by Ray Boltz, 1988

EPs
 Thank You (Brave Girls EP) or the title song (see below), 2022
 Thank You (Jamala EP), or the title song, 2014
 Thank You, by Bombadil, 2012
 Thank You, by Shaun Fleming, 2011

Songs
 "Thank You" (Amy Diamond song), 2008
 "Thank You" (Bow Wow song), 2001
 "Thank You" (Boyz II Men song), 1995
 "Thank You" (Brave Girls song), 2022
 "Thank You" (Busta Rhymes song), 2013
 "Thank You" (Dido song), 1998
 "Thank You" (Estelle song), 2011
 "Thank You" (Hellyeah song), 2008
 "Thank You" (Jamelia song), 2004
 "Thank You" (Led Zeppelin song), 1969
 "Thank You" (Lena Meyer-Landrut song), 2019
 "Thank You" (MKTO song), 2012
 "Thank You" (Sevendust song), 2015
 "Thank You (Falettinme Be Mice Elf Agin)", by Sly and the Family Stone, 1969
 "Thank You (for Loving Me at My Worst)", by The Whitlams, 1999
 "Thank U", by Alanis Morissette, 1998
 "Thank You", by Alcazar from Disco Defenders
 "Thank You", by Amanda Lear
 "Thank You", by Ana Moura from Desfado, originally by David Poe
 "Thank You", by Angie Stone from Black Diamond
 "Thank You", by Bobby Womack from My Prescription
 "Thank You", by Bobbysocks!
 "Thank You", by Bonnie Raitt from Bonnie Raitt
 "Thank You", by Brandon Lake from Help!
 "Thank You", by the Calling from Camino Palmero
 "Thank You", by Chris Brown from Chris Brown
 "Thank You", by Chris Cornell from Songbook
 "Thank You", by Celine Dion from Loved Me Back to Life
 "Thank You", by Commodores from Rock Solid
 "Thank You", by Gentle Giant from Giant for a Day!
 "Thank You", by Gotthard from Bang!
 "Thank You", by Helen Reddy from Ear Candy
 "Thank You", by Ice Prince from Everybody Loves Ice Prince
 "Thank You", by Jane Child from Jane Child
 "Thank You", by Jay-Z from The Blueprint 3
 "Thank You", by Johnny Reid from Kicking Stones
 "Thank You", by Keith Urban from Defying Gravity
 "Thank You", by KMFDM from Money
 "Thank You", by Leona Lewis from I Am
 "Thank You", by Logic from YSIV
 "Thank You", by Lou Bega from Lounatic
 "Thank You", by Mary Mary from Incredible
 "Thank You", by Mike Posner from At Night, Alone
 "Thank You", by Nicky Byrne from Sunlight
 "Thank You", by Noni Răzvan Ene
 "Thank You", by Norman Bedard
 "Thank You", by Paul Kelly from The Merri Soul Sessions
 "Thank You", by Paul Revere & The Raiders from Alias Pink Puzz
 "Thank You", by Philip Bailey from Triumph
 "Thank You", by Psy from PsyFive
 "Thank You", by Ray J from Everything You Want
 "Thank You", by The Redwalls from De Nova
 "Thank You", by Roscoe, featuring Kendrick Lamar
 "Thank You", by Sarah Connor from Naughty but Nice
 "Thank You", by Shaggy from Shaggy & Friends
 "Thank You", by Shinhwa from Winter Story
 "Thank You", by Simple Plan from Still Not Getting Any...
 "Thank You", by Simply Red from Love and the Russian Winter
 "Thank You", by Sister Hazel from Fortress
 "Thank You", by The Slackers from The Great Rocksteady Swindle
 "Thank You", by Strawbs from Bursting at the Seams
 "Thank You", by Super Junior from Don't Don
 "Thank You", by Swans from Filth
 "Thank You", by Westlife from Turnaround
 "Thank You", by The Wilkinsons from Home
 "Thank You", by Will Young from 85% Proof
 "Thank You", by Willie Nelson from Angel Eyes
 "Thank You", by Xzibit from Full Circle
 "Thank You", by Yolanda Adams from Believe
 "Thank You (Dedication to Fans...)", by Christina Aguilera from Back to Basics
 "Thank U", by Ayumi Hamasaki from Love Songs
 "Thank You Song", by FKA Twigs from Caprisongs

See also
 Letter of thanks
 I Thank You (disambiguation)
 Thankful (disambiguation)
 Thanks (disambiguation)
 
 Gratitude